Ana Paula Cristovão Lemos dos Santos (born 17 October 1963) is the widow of former president of Angola, José Eduardo dos Santos. She served as Angola's First lady from 1991 to 2017. 

A former fashion model and air hostess on the Angolan presidential aircraft, dos Santos met her husband during the time she was working on presidential flights. They married on 17 May 1991 and are parents of three children, Eduane Danilo dos Santos (born 29 September 1991), Joseana dos Santos (born 5 April 1995) and Eduardo Breno dos Santos (born 2 October 1998). Between 1990 and 1994, she completed a state teacher training at the National Institute of Education, Luanda. Later she completed a course of law at the Faculty of Law of the Agostinho Neto University.

A diplomat described the president and first lady as: "a handsome couple, elegantly and expensively dressed, looking for all the world as though they're living in southern California." In 1997 Ana Paula undiplomatically announced that her five-year-old son would enroll at the Portuguese school in Luanda because of the "bad quality" of state education (for which many hold her husband responsible). She has also tried to make her presence felt in administrative matters; a move which has irritated the political mainstream. Also under fire are her business interests, particularly diamonds.

Dos Santos is a patron of the Committee to support rural women (COMUR), supporting with micro-credit funds. She represented her country at the Micro-credit Summit for Heads of States and Governments in Washington, D.C., in 1997. 

Dos Santos is also very active in her support of landmine victims. She founded the Lwini Foundation for social solidarity which is dedicated to the support of civilians, particularly women and children.

References

External links
 Biographical Information
 Website Lwini Fund
 Website Microcredit Summit Campaign

1963 births
Living people
First ladies of Angola
20th-century Angolan people
21st-century Angolan people
Ana Paula